Monitor is a small unincorporated community in Perry Township, Tippecanoe County, in the U.S. state of Indiana, now almost virtually extinct.

History

The town's original name was Cynthyana.

A post office was established at Monitor in 1864, and remained in operation until it was discontinued in 1902.

The former Monitor schoolhouse was used as a drug addiction treatment facility until 2007.  In 2010 it was set on fire in an arson incident.

Geography 
Monitor is located at 40°25'11" North, 86°45'24" West (40.419722, -86.756667) and has an elevation of approximately 589 feet.

References 

Unincorporated communities in Indiana
Unincorporated communities in Tippecanoe County, Indiana